Gurbanguly Mälikgulyýewiç Berdimuhamedow (born 29 June 1957), also known as Arkadag (Cyrillic: Аркадаг, "protector"), is a Turkmen politician who served as the 2nd President of Turkmenistan from 2007 to 2022, when he entered into a power-sharing arrangement with his son, Serdar, the current president.

A dentist by profession, Berdimuhamedow served in the government of the president, Saparmyrat Nyýazow, as the minister of health in 1997 and as the vice-president in 2001. He became acting president following Nyýazow's death on 21 December 2006 and subsequently won the 2007 presidential election. He faced no meaningful opposition and won by an overwhelming margin with 89% of the vote. In 2012, he was re-elected for a second term with 97% of the vote and he was re-elected again in 2017 with 97.7% of the vote. He was among the candidates elected to the People's Council of Turkmenistan on 28 March 2021, as a member from Ahal Region. He reportedly received 100% of votes from the electors. On 14 April 2021, he was unanimously elected chairman of the People's Council, the upper chamber of the Turkmen parliament.

Like his predecessor, Berdimuhamedow heads an authoritarian regime and is the subject of a cult of personality. Rights groups have described Turkmenistan under Berdimuhamedow as one of the most repressive countries in the world, accusing Berdimuhamedow, his relatives, and his associates of possessing and exercising unlimited power over all aspects of public life.

Berdimuhamedow stepped down as president on 19 March 2022, being succeeded by his son, Serdar, who won a snap election deemed as neither free nor fair. The People's Council was subsequently re-formed as the country's top leadership body in January 2023, with Serdar then reappointing his father as its chairman and granting him the title "National Leader of the Turkmen People".

Early years
Berdimuhamedow was born on 29 June 1957 in Babarap, in what is now Gökdepe District, Ahal Province, to Mýalikguly Berdimuhamedowiç Berdimuhamedow (1932–2021) and Ogulabat Atayevna Kurrayeva. He is the only son in a family of six children. Berdimuhamedow’s father worked as a senior Interior Ministry officer in a prison guard detachment. He retired as a colonel of police. His grandfather, Berdimuhamed Annaýew, was a local teacher who served in the Red Army during World War II as part of the 748th Rifle Regiment of the 206th Rifle Division of the 2nd Ukrainian Front. In September 1943, his unit was one of the first to cross the Dnieper River. He was later killed in the 1948 Ashgabat earthquake.

Professional career 
Berdimuhamedow graduated from the Turkmen State Medical Institute in 1979 and entered a career in dentistry. He also received a PhD in medical sciences in Moscow. By 1992 he had become part of the dentistry faculty at the Medical Institute. In 1995, during the rule of Saparmyrat Nyýazow, he became head of the dentistry center of the Ministry of Health and Medical Industry.

Political rise 
He was appointed to the government as Minister of Health in 1997, and he was additionally appointed as Deputy Chairman of the Cabinet of Ministers (also referred to as Deputy Prime Minister, despite the lack of a Prime Ministerial post in Turkmenistan), a post akin to that of a Vice-President, in 2001. In April 2004, Nyýazow suspended Berdimuhamedow's salary for three months because healthcare workers were not being paid.

The Health Ministry was responsible for carrying out Nyýazow's order to close all hospitals outside of the national and provincial capitals in 2005.

President of Turkmenistan (2006–2022)
Following Nyýazow's death in December 2006, the State Security Council of Turkmenistan appointed Berdimuhamedow acting president. The Council stated in its announcement that Öwezgeldi Ataýew, who, as the Chairman of the Assembly of Turkmenistan was to have become the acting president, was not appointed "in view of the fact that the prosecutor-general had instituted criminal proceedings against him".

Article 60 of the Turkmen Constitution stipulated that the acting president "may not stand for election to the Presidency", which would have barred Berdimuhamedow from running in the 2007 presidential elections. However, on 24 December 2006, the People's Council voted to remove this provision, making him eligible for the election as one of the six chosen candidates, all members of the Democratic Party of Turkmenistan. Berdimuhamedov was supported by the political elite, and the official results showed him as winning 89% of the vote. Berdimuhamedow's appointment as interim president and subsequent run for president, however, violated the constitution.

In his first presidential trip abroad, Berdimuhamedov visited Saudi Arabia in mid-April 2007. There he performed the Umrah pilgrimage and met with King Abdullah. He then visited Russia and President Vladimir Putin at the end of the same month.

After taking office, Berdimuhamedow reversed several of Nyýazow's more eccentric policies. Internet cafés offering free and uncensored web access opened in Ashgabat, compulsory education was extended from nine to ten years and classes in sports and foreign languages were re-introduced into the curriculum, and the government announced plans to open several specialised schools for the arts. He called for reform of education, health care and pension systems, and government officials of non-Turkmen ethnic origin who had been sacked by Nyýazow were allowed to return to work. He also restored the pensions of 100,000 elderly people whose pensions Nyýazow had slashed in the face of an unspecified budget crisis. Later on, he reopened the Turkmen Academy of Sciences, which had been closed by Nyýazow.

In 2015, work on TAPI began under his government.

In February 2017, he was reelected to a third term as President of Turkmenistan (seven-year term) with nearly 98% of the votes in his favour and with an eligible voter turnout of 97%. In October 2017, he offered a top Turkmen-bred variety of the Central Asian shepherd dog to Vladimir Putin.

He is president of the National Olympic Committee of Turkmenistan.

In 2020, Berdimuhamedow presided over the COVID-19 pandemic in Turkmenistan. He was among eight world leaders to have received the Ig Nobel Prize in Medical Education "for using the COVID-19 viral pandemic to teach the world that politicians can have a more immediate effect on life and death than scientists and doctors can". On 10 November of that same year, he unveiled a golden statue of his favourite dog breed, the Central Asian shepherd.

Berdimuhamedow replaced the Interior Minister Mammetkhan Chakiyev with his deputy Ovezdurdy Khojaniyazov on 1 July 2021. Khojaniyazov has little public profile to speak of, but one of his most recent positions, as of May at least, was as deputy head of the Awaza tourist recreation zone. The previous Interior Minister, Iskender Mulikov, was arrested, sentenced to a lengthy prison term on corruption charges, and shown on state television handcuffed in a prison robe with his head shaved.

In July 2021, Berdimuhamedow ordered the deployment of troops and heavy weapons and armour on the Afghanistan–Turkmenistan border, in order to avoid a spillover of the Afghan conflict into Turkmenistan.

In February 2022, it was reported from Reuters that Berdimuhamedow was planning to resign after an early presidential election on 12 March, fuelling speculation that he would be preparing for his son Serdar to succeed him as the next President. Berdimuhamedow did not contest the election, which was subsequently won by Serdar, establishing Turkmenistan as the first Central Asian country to transfer power dynastically from father to son. Serdar was inaugurated as the next President on 19 March.

Post-presidency and National Leader
The People's Council of Turkmenistan was restored in September 2020. While still serving as president Berdimuhamedow stood for election from Ahal Province and won a seat on 28 March 2021. He was subsequently unanimously elected chairperson of the People's Council despite that being a violation of the constitution. 

On 21 January 2023, Berdimuhamedow's son, as president, reappointed Berdimuhamedow to the chairmanship of the reorganised People's Council (viz.). Via a separate "constitutional law" signed into effect 21 January 2023, President Serdar Berdimuhamedow also appointed his father "national leader" of Turkmenistan. This appointment accords the elder Berdimuhamedow the right to speak out on any matter of public interest, as well as immunity from prosecution (which immunity extends also to members of his family), personal protection by national security agencies, and financial support from the government. New laws were quickly promulgated that named the new People's Council the "supreme organ of state authority" in Turkmenistan, making its chairman a supreme leader outranking the president. 

Berdimuhamedow visited Moscow in November 2022 at the invitation of the speaker of the Russian upper house, Valentina Matvienko. He subsequently made additional trips abroad and met with visiting foreign delegations. His first foreign visit as National Leader was to the United Arab Emirates in February 2023.

Criticism

Accusations of totalitarianism

Upon taking office, Berdimuhamedow eased travel restrictions and reopened libraries in rural areas. He also took steps to curb Nyýazow's extensive personality cult. He called for an end to the elaborate pageants of music and dancing that formerly greeted the president on his arrival anywhere, and said that the Turkmen "sacred oath", part of which states that the speaker's tongue should shrivel if he ever speaks ill of Turkmenistan or its president, should not be recited multiple times a day but reserved for "special occasions". He also gave up his right to rename any landmarks, institutions, or cities, restored the traditional names of the months of the year and days of the week (Nyýazow had renamed them after himself and his mother, among other things), and announced plans to move the gold rotating statue of Nyýazow from Ashgabat's central square.

Despite these changes, Berdimuhamedow's regime remained rigidly authoritarian; indeed, in 2007, he ruled out any move toward Western-style democracy. Freedom House rated Berdimuhamedow's Turkmenistan as one of the most repressive and "closed" regimes in the world. It has ranked Turkmenistan near the bottom of its Freedom in the World rankings since the country's independence, a state of affairs that has continued since Berdimuhamedow took office. In 2017, the country was one of 11 with the lowest aggregate scores for political and civil rights. Human Rights Watch noted that Berdimuhamedow not only has complete control over public life and the media, but presides over a regime that does not tolerate "alternative political or religious expression." Reporters Without Borders (RSF) has ranked Turkmenistan near the bottom of its Press Freedom Index for most of Berdimuhamedow's tenure, as it did under Nyýazow. In 2017, RWB ranked Turkmenistan 178th out of 180 countries surveyed, ahead of Eritrea and North Korea. RSF noted that internet access is heavily censored in Turkmenistan, and that satellite dishes have been removed by government officials.

In 2008, he dismissed Akmyrat Rejepow, the longtime chief of the presidential security detail and one of the main proponents of Nyýazow's personality cult. In 2011, he sang a song on a video posted to YouTube.

In May 2013, he fell off his horse during a race. The fall was censored on TV but leaked online, and mocked on an episode of HBO's Last Week Tonight with John Oliver in 2019. Journalists leaving the country following the accident, reported that their electronic devices were searched for traces of footage of the incident.

In July 2013, Jennifer Lopez publicly apologised for singing Happy birthday! to Berdimuhamedow during a sponsored concert, stating she was not aware of the human rights issues in Turkmenistan prior to the show. In August 2013, Berdimuhamedow suspended his Democratic Party of Turkmenistan membership for the duration of his presidency, ostensibly to remain "above partisan politics" and "promote a multiparty system."

In 2015, a golden statue of Berdimuhamedow riding a horse atop a white-marble cliff was erected in Ashgabat.

The Turkmenistan Parliament abolished term limits for the presidency in September 2016, which allowed Berdimuhamedow to run for a third term.

In January 2018, Berdimuhamedow ordered the impounding of black cars in the capital because he considered the color white to be "lucky". Police seized dark-coloured vehicles in Ashgabat and their owners were told they must pay to have them repainted silver or white. The capital, known as the 'City of White Marble', holds the world record for the highest concentration of white-marble buildings. Berdimuhamedow is a known lover of the color white, living in a white palace and travelling in white limousines. It was later reported that the ban extended to vehicles of all colours except white.

In July 2018, he appeared in a rap video with his grandson. He had previously lifted weights on camera, and also acted as DJ.

By decree of Berdimuhamedow in January 2019, the government will gradually end state funding of the Academy of Sciences of Turkmenistan; it will be phased out in three years.

Violation of individual rights 
In 2010 the Obozrevatel magazine named Berdimuhamedow the fifth-worst dictator in the world out of 23 highlighted. In the Press Freedom Index (Reporters Without Borders), Turkmenistan ranks 176 out of 178.

Turkmenistan has more political prisoners than any of the other former countries of the former Soviet Union.

Corruption 

The country's economy is under total state control. Numerous attempts to attract foreign investors into the country often end in lawsuits in international courts. In 2018, the International Center for the Settlement of Investment Disputes (arbitration, part of the World Bank group of organisations) received claims against Turkmenistan from Sece Inşaat (Turkey) and investment company Unionmatex Industrieanlagen GmbH (Germany).

In 2019, the Belarusian construction company Belgorkhimprom also filed a similar claim with the court, to which Turkmenistan should pay about $200 million.

Investors talk about discrimination by the Turkmen authorities, politicised bureaucracy, and a high level of corruption.

In the Transparency International Corruption Perception Index, Turkmenistan ranked 161 among 180 countries in 2018. This is the lowest rating among countries in Eastern Europe and Central Asia.

In 2019, Turkmenistan ranked 164th among 180 countries in the ranking of economic freedom.

Cult of personality 

He uses the honorific title Arkadag, translating to "protector" in the Turkmen language. 

Berdimuhamedow's grandfather and father both serve as part of his cult of personality. His grandfather, Berdimuhamed Annayev, has since 2018 been a posthumous recipient of the Russian Order of Honour, being one of two awards he holds (the other being the Soviet Order of the Badge of Honour). The Berdimuhamed Annayev 1st Specialized Military School of the Ministry of Defence is named in his honour. A museum in the defence ministry is also named after him. In May 2020, a special delegation from Russia led by Deputy Minister of Defence Alexander Fomin brought the banner of Annayev's unit to Ashgabat, being trooped through the square in front of the Halk Hakydasy Memorial Complex during the inaugural Victory Day Parade in the capital.

On 1 September 2009, Secondary School No. 27 was renamed after Berdimuhamed Annayev and was opened with his son at the opening ceremony. In October 2012, the Main Drama Theater of Turkmenistan staged a play based on Berdimuhamedov's book about his grandfather called "Good Name Imperishable". Military Unit 1001 of the Ministry of Internal Affairs is named in honour of Berdimuhamedow's father, Malikguly Berdimuhamedow. In addition, in the town of Yzgant, the Palace of Culture is named after Berdimuhamedow's father, and a bust of him stands in front of it.

On 20 December 2022, the Turkmen National Council of Turkmenistan passed a decree naming the new capital of Ahal Province "Arkadag" in honour of Berdimuhamedow. Additionally, three buildings were named in honour of Berdimuhamedov or members of his family: a health and rehabilitation center in his honour, the horse breeding academy after his great-uncle, and a pedagogical school after his grandfather.

The 21 January 2023 presidential decree appointing Berdimuhamedow chair of the People's Council contains the following paragraph as justification for his appointment as National Leader:"Considering the tremendous merits in establishing a solid foundation for a democratic and secular state with rule of law, all-around development and strengthening the international prestige of independent neutral Turkmenistan, strengthening the unity of society, harmony and cohesion of the people during long years of state and social work, recognition as a prominent statesman and politician, who has received great honor, great respect, and esteem of the Turkmen people, high organizational skills in wise management  demonstrating an outstanding example of competence, decisiveness, and leadership, successfully implementing the humane policy of "The state is for the man!" in the era of the Renaissance of the new era of the powerful state..."

Portraits of Gurbanguly Berdimuhamedow are displayed in businesses and government offices, and during his presidency were affixed to the front bulkhead of airliners of the national airline. In February 2023, a new magazine, Arkadagly Ýaşlar ("Youth with Arkadag") began publication.

Honours

Domestic awards
 1994 – Star of President Order
 2016 – Medal «Türkmenistanyň Garaşsyzlygynyň 25 ýyllygyna» (25 Years of Turkmenistan's Independence)
 2019 – «Hormatly il ýaşulusy» (Honorary Elder of the State)
 2021 – «Türkmenistanyň ussat halypa seýsi» (Master Equestrian of Turkmenistan)
 2022 – Skilful Diplomat of Turkmenistan

Foreign awards
 2007 – : Order of King Abdulaziz
2007 – : Order of Zayed
 2007 – : Order of Distinguished Service
 2008 – : Medal "10 years of Astana"
 2010 – : Order of Ismoili Somoni
 2011 – : Order of Sheikh Isa bin Salman Al Khalifa
 2012 – : First Class of the Order of the State of Republic of Turkey
 2013 – : Order of the Republic of Serbia
 2014 – : Honorary Professor, Beijing Medical University
 2014 – : Order of Sheikh-ul-Islam
 2015 – : Honorary Doctorate, Sungkyunkwan University
 2015 – : Honorary Doctorate, University of Tsukuba
 2016 – : Gazy Mohammad Akbar Khan Medal
 2016 – : Honorary Doctor of Political Science, Quaid-i-Azam University
 2016, 2017 – : Order of the Republic
 2017 – : Order of Gagauz-Yeri
 2017 – : Order of Dostyk 
 2017 – : Order of Alexander Nevsky
 2017 – : Order of Dyslyk
 2018 – : Certificate of Award "for development of mass media", Asia-Pacific Broadcasters Association
 2022 – : Order of the Golden Eagle
2022 – : Order "For Merit to the Fatherland"

Supranational 
 2022 – : 2022 Supreme Order of Turkic World

Personal life

Family
According to a cable from the U.S. embassy in Ashgabat, Berdimuhamedow is married and has three daughters and one son. One of his sons-in-law, Yhlasgeldi Amanov, headed the Turkmen State Agency for Management and Use of Hydrocarbon Resources in London, was later assigned to the Turkmenistan Embassies in Berlin and London, and as of 23 November 2019 was Turkmenistan's consul general in Dubai. The other son-in-law is also a diplomat, with a prior posting in Paris, but later assigned to Brussels.

According to the same leaked cables, Gurbanguly Berdimuhamedow has a mistress, Marina, a Russian nurse, whom he supposedly met earlier in his dentist career. They have a daughter together. Berdimuhamedow's wife has been living in London since 2007. His son, Serdar Berdimuhamedow, is the current president of Turkmenistan. Serdar served in the Armed Forces and the Assembly of Turkmenistan, and held a series of high government posts, leading to appointment as a deputy chairman of the Cabinet of Ministers before his election to the presidency. At least three of Berdimuhamedow's grandchildren study in Switzerland: Kerimguly, Ogulbäbek, and Aýgül. According to a biography of Berdimuhamedow's father, Malikguly, published in 2012, Berdimuhamedow has five sisters: Durdynabat (born 1960), Gulnabat (born 1962), Mähri (born 1964), Guljamal (born 1969), and Oguljamal (born 1974).

On 18 April 2021, Gurbanguly Berdimuhamedow's father, Malikguly Berdimuhamedow, reportedly died at the age of 89.

Hobbies
During his spare time, he writes books that are popular in Turkmenistan according to Turkmen propaganda. Aside from writing books, he is known for writing songs, DJing and engaging in health activities.

In 2019, Berdimuhamedow was awarded the highest award of the International Cycling Union (UCI) for his country’s commitment to the sport.

Health
On 20 July 2019, the YouTube channel of a Turkmen opposition media outlet announced that Berdimuhamedow had reportedly died while on holiday at the age of 61. He was said to have been on leave since 15 July. These reports were published by multiple Russian media outlets on the next day. The Turkmen Ambassador to Kyrgyzstan, Shadurdy Mereov, and the Kyrgyz Ministry of Foreign Affairs denied these claims on 21 July. According to Chronicles of Turkmenistan, Berdimuhamedow went to Germany because his mother was receiving medical treatment there, and her condition was critical.

See also
 Politics of Turkmenistan

Notes

References

External links
 
 
 Presidency's official website 
 Berdimuhamedow's Instagram Page
 Electronic Library of the Books of the President of Turkmenistan

1957 births
Living people
Presidents of Turkmenistan
Vice-presidents of Turkmenistan
Democratic Party of Turkmenistan politicians
Ethnic Turkmen people
Turkmenistan dentists
Turkmenistan Muslims
Recipients of the Order of Alexander Nevsky
Turkmenistani generals
Turkmenistan writers
Turkmenistan musicians
Turkmenistani nationalists
Turkmen State Medical University alumni
Recipients of the Gagauz-Yeri Order
Recipients of the Order of the Republic (Moldova)
Health ministers of Turkmenistan
Recipients of the Supreme Order of Turkic World